Johann Gottfried von Aschhausen (1575–1622) was the Prince-Bishop of Bamberg from 1609 to 1622 and Prince-Bishop of Würzburg from 1617 to 1622.

Johann Gottfried von Aschhausen was born in Oberlauda, today a district of Lauda-Königshofen, on 12 August 1575. He became a canon of Bamberg Cathedral in 1593, upon the resignation of an older brother. He was ordained as a priest on 22 December 1601. He became the dean of Comburg in 1604. He played a role in the formation of the Catholic League, under the leadership of Maximilian I, Elector of Bavaria, on 10 July 1609.

He was elected Prince-Bishop of Bamberg on 21 July 1609, with Pope Paul V confirming the appointment on 4 November 1609. He was consecrated as a bishop by Wolfgang von Hausen, Prince-Bishop of Regensburg, on 2 February 1610. As Prince-Bishop of Bamberg, he sought to curb the growth of Protestantism in the Prince-Bishopric of Bamberg, inviting the Jesuits to assume an important role in education in Bamberg. He conducted a witch-hunt in the Prince-Bishopric of Bamberg in 1612–13 and again in 1617–18, which saw approximately 300 accused witches burnt at the stake in this period.

He was elected Prince-Bishop of Würzburg on October 5, 1617, with Pope Paul V confirming the appointment on February 10, 1618. This created a personal union between the Prince-Bishopric of Bamberg and the Prince-Bishopric of Würzburg. During the Thirty Years' War, Bamberg and Würzburg deployed large numbers of infantry and cavalry in 1620 and 1622.

He died in Regensburg on 29 December 1622 and is buried in Bamberg Cathedral.

References

External links

1575 births
1622 deaths
People from Lauda-Königshofen
Prince-Bishops of Bamberg
Prince-Bishops of Würzburg